Carlos Sanguinetti (born 1 January 1961) is a sailor from Argentina, who represented his country at the 1984 Summer Olympics in Los Angeles, United States as crew member in the Soling. With helmsman Pedro Ferrero and fellow crew member Alberto Llorens they took the 13th place.

References

Living people
1961 births
Sailors at the 1984 Summer Olympics – Soling
Olympic sailors of Argentina
Argentine male sailors (sport)